Stadium Liptovský Mikuláš is a home football stadium in Liptovský Mikuláš, Slovakia. It serves as home stadium for football club MFK Tatran Liptovský Mikuláš. The stadium has a capacity of 1,950 (610 seats).

References

External links 
Stadium website 

Football venues in Slovakia
Buildings and structures in Žilina Region